Bahadırlar can refer to:

 Bahadırlar, Ağın
 Bahadırlar, Çal